"Buried Myself Alive" is the second single from the Used's self-titled debut album The Used. The single was released on January 28, 2003 and a music video was released around the same time.

Music video
The music video directed by Arni and Kinski features the band playing in an enclosed space. Each band member is in an inescapable situation: Bert is buried alive in a coffin; Quinn is tied upside down in a bedroom; Branden is trapped in a hall of mirrors; and Jeph is stuck and drowning in an underground sewer.

Track listing
US promotional single
 "Buried Myself Alive" (Radio Edit) – 3:36

Personnel 
 John Feldmann – engineer, mixed by, producer

Charts

Release history

Notes

The Used songs
2002 singles
2002 songs
Reprise Records singles
Songs written by Quinn Allman
Songs written by Jeph Howard
Songs written by Bert McCracken
Song recordings produced by John Feldmann
Songs written by Branden Steineckert